Maplehurst Correctional Complex is a correctional facility located in Milton, Ontario for women and men 18 years of age and older. It is a combined maximum security detention centre for remanded prisoners, and medium/maximum correctional centre for offenders sentenced to less than two years. It used to have a separate wing for minors (12 to 17 years of age) but no longer houses them. It is also known colloquially as the "Milton Hilton" or "Muppethurst". In 1972, the government started a $13.5 million construction project for the Maplehurst Correctional Centre. It was completed in 1974 and continues to operate to this day. Sod was turned on the project on February 9, 1973.

Maplehurst Correctional Complex was built in the mid-1970s as a replacement for several older facilities including the Milton Jail, Halton County Jail, and the Mimico Correctional Centre, although the latter ultimately remained open. John Main was the facility's first administrator (warden), and came over from Mimico.

It was expanded in the late 1980s and again in the early 21st century.

At the official opening of the $89 million modernization in 2001, the Ontario government described the complex as the first facility in Ontario's correctional system to feature a new design with pods: self-contained, 192-bed units where inmates spend their day - including program areas and an outdoor space for exercise. The complex is the size of 100 football fields and was the first of so-called "super-jails" in Ontario. General Population, Protective Population and Segregation/Hospital units are all housed within the facility. It shares its location with the adjacent Vanier Centre for Women, a 333-bed medium and maximum security facility for remanded and sentenced female offenders.

The prison provides a variety of remedial programs, including life skills, addictions, anger management and Alcoholics Anonymous.

Historical Incidents
A riot at Maplehurst Correctional Centre in Milton - during which 18 convicts escaped from the facility - left the interior of the jail in turmoil in 1979. More than $95,000 worth of recreational equipment was smashed. Seven of the escapees were recaptured in the immediate aftermath.

Notable prisoners
 Eric Carty, conspirator in the Jennifer Pan affair
 Snow served eight months of a year sentence for assault causing bodily harm at Maplehurst in the early 1990s.

 Lloyd Banks was held at Maplehurst in 2010 after being arrested with forcible confinement, aggravated assault and robbery in Kitchener, Ontario.

See also 
 List of correctional facilities in Ontario

References

External links
 "Correctional Services Facilities - Correctional Centres." Ontario Ministry of Community Safety & Correctional Services. (in French)

Buildings and structures in the Regional Municipality of Halton
Milton, Ontario
Prisons in Ontario
1974 establishments in Ontario